Rinat Gimadelislamovich Galeyev (1939–2007) was a Russian businessman from the Tatarstan region, and the general director of the sixth-largest Russian oil company Tatneft from 1990 to 1999.

Early life
Galeyev was born in Tatarstan, and graduated from the Ufa Petroleum Institute in 1967, where he specialised as a mining engineering.

Career
Galeyev was the general director of the sixth-largest Russian oil company Tatneft from 1990 to 1999.

References

1939 births
2007 deaths
Businesspeople from Tatarstan
20th-century Russian businesspeople
Russian businesspeople in the oil industry